James A. Knight, MD (October 20, 1918 – July 17, 1998) was a psychiatrist, theologian, medical ethicist, and  ordained Methodist minister.  His principal contributions were in medical student development, the intersection of psychiatry and religion, ethical issues in medicine, and the understanding of conscience.

Knight was born in St. George, South Carolina, on October 20, 1918.  He graduated from Wofford College and earned his MD at Vanderbilt University.  He completed his post-graduate medical training at Grady Hospital in Atlanta, Georgia, and at Duke University Hospital in Durham, North Carolina.  Additionally, Knight completed a Master of Divinity Degree at Duke University and a Master of Public Health degree from Tulane University.

Knight held the Harkness Chair in Psychiatry and Religion at Union Theological Seminary in New York. He then  served in a variety of administrative posts, including Dean of Admissions at Tulane University School of Medicine, where he promoted the admission of people of diverse ethnic and educational backgrounds into medical school.  Knight was the first Dean of the newly formed Texas A&M University College of Medicine, a post he held for five years (1973 - 1978).  He subsequently left university administrative posts to finish his career as a professor at Louisiana State University School of Medicine in New Orleans and return to the Texas A&M College of Medicine as professor from 1992 - 1997.

Knight's many awards included the Distinguished Alumni Award from Wofford College in 1971,  and one for his leadership of the Society for Health and Human Values.

He was a member of the Society for the Scientific Study of Religion.  Knight earned a fellowship from the World Health Organization for study at the C.G. Jung Institute in Zürich, Switzerland, in 1961.

During World War II, he served as a U.S. Navy Chaplain on the USS Sanctuary Haven-class hospital ship.  He died on July 17, 1998, at the age of 79.

External links
 James A. Knight Award for Leadership in Medicine.
 James A. Knight Chair of Humanities and Ethics in Medicine at Tulane University School of Medicine.
 A 1963 photograph of Knight can be viewed on-line.

Selected books
 "Doctor-To-Be: Coping with the Trials and Triumphs of Medical School", James A. Knight, Appleton-Century-Crofts, publishers, 1981, .
 "A Psychiatrist Looks at Religion and Health", Abington Press, New York, 1964.
 "For the Love of Money: Human Behavior and Money", J.B. Lippincott, Philadelphia, 1968.

References

1918 births
1998 deaths
American psychiatrists
Tulane University faculty
Wofford College alumni
Vanderbilt University School of Medicine alumni
Tulane University School of Public Health and Tropical Medicine alumni
20th-century American physicians
People from St. George, South Carolina